Valerian Savelievich (Saulovich) Dovgalevsky (23 September 1885 – 14 July 1934) was a member of the Bolshevik revolutionary movement, Soviet statesman, diplomat and People's Commissar of Posts and Telegraphs of the Russian Socialist Federative Soviet Republic.

He was a member of the Russian Social Democratic Labour Party since 1908 and the French Socialist Party since 1915.

Biography
He participated in the revolutionary movement since 1904. In 1906, he was arrested and sentenced to an eternal settlement. In the spring of 1908 however, he fled abroad.

1908–1910 – Secretary of the Bolshevik group in Liège (Belgium);
1911–1914 – Secretary of the Bolshevik group in Toulouse (France);
Graduated from the Electrotechnical Institute in Toulouse in 1913.
In July 1917, he returned to Russia and in 1918, he joined the Red Army.
1919–1920 – in the People's Commissariat of Railways of the Russian Socialist Federative Soviet Republic;
1920 – Member of the Commission of the Council of Labor and Defense of the Russian Socialist Federative Soviet Republic for the restoration of roads in Siberia and the Urals;
1920 – communications inspector and commissar of the district engineering department in Kiev;
1921–1923 – People's Commissar of Posts and Telegraphs of the Russian Socialist Federative Soviet Republic;
1923–1924 – Deputy People's Commissar of Posts and Telegraphs of the Soviet Union;
1924–1927 – Plenipotentiary Representative of the Soviet Union in Sweden;
March – October 1927 – Plenipotentiary Representative of the Soviet Union in Japan;
1927–1934 – Plenipotentiary Representative of the Soviet Union in France.

In October 1929, he signed a protocol in London on the restoration of Soviet–British diplomatic relations, which were severed in May 1927. In November 1932, he signed the Soviet–French Non–Aggression Pact. Since 1933, he took part in the work of the conference on disarmament in Geneva.

He died on 14 July 1934, in a clinic near Paris from intestinal cancer. Condolences over his death were expressed by President Albert Lebrun and Foreign Minister Louis Barthou. He was cremated at the Père Lachaise crematorium. The urn with his ashes was delivered by plane to Moscow and buried in the Necropolis Near the Kremlin Wall.

References

External links

Dovgalevsky Valerian Savelievich
Biography in the Handbook of the History of the Communist Party and the Soviet Union 1898–1991

1885 births
1934 deaths
Burials at the Kremlin Wall Necropolis
Communist Party of the Soviet Union members
Soviet diplomats
Ambassadors of the Soviet Union to Sweden
Ambassadors of the Soviet Union to Japan
Ambassadors of the Soviet Union to France
French socialists
Deaths from cancer in France
Deaths from colorectal cancer